Stefano Guidotti (born 16 June 1999) is a Swiss footballer who plays for St. Gallen.

Club career
On 8 July 2022, Guidotti signed a two-year contract with St. Gallen.

Honours
Lugano
Swiss Cup: 2021–22

References

1999 births
People from Locarno
Sportspeople from Ticino
Living people
Swiss men's footballers
Association football midfielders
Switzerland youth international footballers
FC Lugano players
FC Chiasso players
FC St. Gallen players
Swiss Super League players
Swiss Challenge League players
Swiss Promotion League players
2. Liga Interregional players